The 2018 CBA Playoffs was the postseason tournament of the Chinese Basketball Association's 2017–18 season. It began on 3 March 2018. In this season, the playoffs were expanded from 8 teams to 10 teams.

Bracket

Pre-elimination Playoffs
All times are in China standard time (UTC+8)

(8) Shenzhen Leopards vs. (9) Guangzhou Long-Lions

(7) Beijing Ducks vs. (10) Shanghai Sharks

First round

(1) Zhejiang Lions vs. (8) Shenzhen Leopards

(4) Shandong Golden Stars vs. (5) Jiangsu Dragons

(2) Liaoning Flying Leopards vs. (7) Beijing Ducks

(3) Guangdong Southern Tigers vs. (6) Xinjiang Flying Tigers

Semifinals
All times are in China standard time (UTC+8)

(1) Zhejiang Lions vs. (4) Shandong Golden Stars 

In the third quarter of game 6, Shandong star Ding Yanyuhang went down with a knee injury. He did not return or play in game 7, leading to his team's loss.

(2) Liaoning Flying Leopards vs. (3) Guangdong Southern Tigers

Finals

(1)Zhejiang Lions vs. (2) Liaoning Flying Leopards

References

Chinese Basketball Association playoffs
playoffs